The event was held in Buenos Aires, immediately after the 8th Chess Olympiad, from 2nd to 19 October 1939 at the Círculo de Ajedrez, one of the two main chess clubs in the city. Play took place at the club's long-time premises at Bartolomé Mitre 670, with rounds starting at 20.30 hours in the evening. All participants, except of Paul Keres, had decided to stay in Argentina due to outbreak of World War II.

The results and standings:

References

Chess competitions
Chess in Argentina
1939 in chess
Sports competitions in Buenos Aires
1939 in Argentine sport
1930s in Buenos Aires
October 1939 sports events